The Puremāhaia River is a river of the Tasman Region of New Zealand's South Island. It flows northeast through Puramāhoi, where it crosses under State Highway 60, before reaching Golden Bay five kilometres northwest of Tākaka.

See also
List of rivers of New Zealand

References

Rivers of the Tasman District
Rivers of New Zealand